In Sunni Islam, karamat ( karāmāt, pl. of  karāmah, lit. generosity, high-mindedness) refers to supernatural wonders performed by Muslim saints. In the technical vocabulary of Islamic religious sciences, the singular form karama has a sense similar to charism, a favor or spiritual gift freely bestowed by God.  The marvels ascribed to Muslim saints have included supernatural physical actions, predictions of the future, and "interpretation of the secrets of hearts". The concept is closely related to that of Barakah (divine blessing) which endows the individual with such abilities. 
The word itself seems to be a loan word from Persian or Caucasian. Keremet is a demi god of miracles in the Mari theology in Caucasian region. 
Historically, a "belief in the miracles of saints (karāmāt al-awliyāʾ, literally 'marvels of the friends [of God]')" has been a part of Sunni Islam. This is evident from the fact that an acceptance of the miracles wrought by saints is taken for granted by many of the major authors of the Islamic Golden Age (ca. 700–1400), as well as by many prominent late-medieval scholars. According to orthodox Sunni doctrine, all miracles performed by saints are done by the leave of God, and usually involve a "breaking of the natural order of things" (k̲h̲āriḳ li’l-ʿāda)," or represent, in other words, "an extraordinary happening which breaks the 'divine custom' (sunnat Allāh) which is the normal course of events." Traditionally, Sunni Islam has also strictly emphasized that the miracle of a saint, however extraordinary it may be, is never in any way the "sign of a prophetic mission," and this has been stressed in order to safeguard the Islamic doctrine of Muhammad being the Seal of the Prophets.

The doctrine of the karāmāt al-awliyāʾ, which became enshrined as an orthodox and required belief in many of the most prominent Sunni creeds of the classical era such as the Creed of Tahawi (ca. 900) and the Creed of Nasafi (ca. 1000), emerged from the two basic Islamic doctrinal sources of the Quran and the hadith. As the Quran referred to the miracles of non-prophetic saintly people like Khidr (18:65–82), the disciples of Jesus (5:111–115), and the People of the Cave (18:7–26), amongst many others, many prominent early scholars deduced that a group of venerable people must exist who occupy a rank below the prophets but who are nevertheless capable of performing miracles. The references in the corpus of hadith literature to bona fide miracle-working saints like the pre-Islamic Jurayj̲ (seemingly an Arabic form of the Greek Grēgorios), only lent further credence to this early understanding of the miracles of the saints. The fourteenth-century Hanbali scholar Ibn Taymiyyah (d. 1328), in spite of his well-known objections to the visiting of saints' graves, nevertheless stated: "The miracles of saints are absolutely true and correct, by the acceptance of all Muslim scholars. And the Qur'an has pointed to it in different places, and the sayings of the Prophet have mentioned it, and whoever denies the miraculous power of saints are only people who are innovators and their followers." As one contemporary scholar has expressed it, practically all of the major scholars of the classical and medieval eras believed that "the lives of saints and their miracles were incontestable."

In the modern world, this doctrine of the miracles of saints has been challenged by certain movements within the branches of Salafism, Wahhabism, and Islamic modernism, as certain followers of some of these movements have come to view the very idea of Muslim saints "as being both un-Islamic and backwards ... rather than the integral part of Islam which they were for over a millennium." Islamic modernists, in particular, have had a tendency to dismiss the traditional idea of miracles of saints as "superstitious" rather than authentically Islamic. Despite the presence, however, of these opposing streams of thought, the classical doctrine continues to thrive in many parts of the Islamic world today, playing a vital role in the daily piety of vast portions of Muslim countries like Pakistan, Egypt, Turkey, Senegal, Iraq, Iran, Algeria, Tunisia, Indonesia, Malaysia, and Morocco, as well as in countries with substantive Islamic populations like India, China, Russia, and the Balkans.

See also
Haydar Ghazi, also known as Abul Karamat
Tay al-Arz, the saintly power of teleportation
Datuk Keramat, local folk religion in Malaysia and Singapore

References

Further reading
Reynold A. Nicholson, Chapter 5 "Saints and Miracles" of  The Mystics of Islam. 2002.  pp. 88–104
Trimingham, J. Spencer. The Sufi Orders in Islam. Oxford University Press. 1971.  pp. 26–28

Islamic terminology
Islamic miracles